The Romantic Story of Margaret Catchpole, generally referred to as Margaret Catchpole, is a 1911 Australian silent film directed by Raymond Longford and starring Lottie Lyell. It is based on the true story of Margaret Catchpole, an adventurer and convict.

Only part of the film survives today.

Synopsis
In the south coast of England, a young woman, Margaret Catchpole (Lottie Lyell), is pursued by two men, the smuggler Will Laud (Raymond Longford) and the coastguard officer Lieutenant Barry (Augustus Neville). Laud is killed in a fight with coast guards and Margaret is sentenced to Botany Bay for horse stealing. She later marries Barry, who has since moved to Sydney, and becomes well-regarded for her hospital work.

Cast
Lottie Lyell as Margaret Catchpole
Raymond Longford as Will Laud
Augustus Neville as Lieutenant Barry
Sybil Wilde as Little Kitty
William Coulter as Lord Chief Justice
E. Melville as Justice Heath
Fred Hardy as Chaloner Archdeckne
J. Eldridge as Landlord of the Bull Inn
Jack Goodall as Edward Catchpole
J. Howard as Reverend O'Gharty
H. Parker	as Lieutenant Bourne
C. Swain as Landlord of the Chester Inn
Fred Twitcham as Mr. Cobbold
Walter Vincent	as Captain Luff, a smuggler

Source material

In 1845 Richard Cobbold's historical novel The History of Margaret Catchpole: A Suffolk Girl was published, which helped make Catchpole famous, even if it did distort history, and made dull reading.

The novel was dramatised in the play Margaret Catchpole, the Heroine of Sussex (1845) by Edward Sterling, played at the Charlie Napier Theatre, Ballarat, in November 1859. A later adaptation An English Lass by Alfred Dampier and C. H. Krieger, was played at the Standard Theatre, Sydney in 1887. The play was revived in 1893.

The structure of the play was as follows:
ACT 1 – Birthplace of Margaret Catchpole at Naeton, Suffolk. A May Day Morning.
ACT 2 – Temptation. The conflict between Right and Wrong.
ACT 3 – Scene 1 : Ipswich Gaol, Under Sentence of Death.
ACT 3 – Scene 2: A street in Ipswich. The Escape. The Pursuit.
ACT 3 – Scene 3 : The Ruins of Walton Castle. Death of Laud.
ACT 4 – The Assigned Convict Servant.
ACT 5 – Lost in the Bush. Heroism of Margaret.

Laurence Irving, son of Sir Henry Irving produced a play on Catchpole which premiered in 1911.

Production
Spencer had produced three films based on plays by Alfred Dampier under the direction of Alfred Rolfe and wanted to make a fourth.  However Rolfe left Spencer to run the Australian Photo-Play Company so Raymond Longford, who had worked on the earlier films as an actor, stepped in as director.

The film was shot in July 1911. No screenwriter was credited.

It enabled Lottie Lyell to demonstrate her skills as a horsewoman. Spencer's own horse "Arno", specially imported from England, appears.

The first half of the film, the section set in England, survives today. Comprising 1,596 feet at 24 minutes it is the earliest surviving example of the work of Lyell and Raymond Longford.

Release
The film was successful at the box office and received strong reviews. The critic from The Sydney Morning Herald stated that:
 Mr Spencer has now produced several Australian taken and manufactured pictures, all of which have been of highest class, but it is questionable if he has done anything better than his latest effort. From the first scene to the last the pictures are good, the flicker being reduced to a minimum... Set among charming old-world scenery with the quaint costumes of our great grandparents the opening scene of the May-day dance is a jewel picture, and the promise of the opening scene is fulfilled throughout. The cliff and water scenery one can safely say, has never been surpassed in Australian picture shows. Through all her varying tones, from peaceful home in England to happiness in Australia, Margaret is charming, and carries the sympathy of the audience with her. Last in the cast of characters, but far from last in the hearts of the audience, are the splendid horses that play so important a part in the story.

American release
It was one of a number of Spencer films bought for release in the United States. Its title was changed to The Queen of the Smugglers.

References

External links

25 minute extract of film at National Film and Sound Archive YouTube channel
The Romantic Story of Margaret Catchpole at National Film and Sound Archive
Copies of film at Trove
Biography of Margaret Catchpole at Australian Dictionary of Biography
Margaret Catchpole collection at State Library of New South Wales
Full text of The History of Margaret Catchpole: A Suffolk Girl by Richard Cobbold at Project Gutenberg
The Romantic Story of Margaret Catchpole at AustLit
The History of Margaret Catchopole: A Suffolk Girl at AustLit

1911 films
Australian drama films
Australian silent feature films
Australian black-and-white films
Films directed by Raymond Longford
1911 drama films
Silent drama films
1910s English-language films